The 2012–13 season was Stenhousemuir's fourth consecutive season in the Scottish Second Division, having been promoted from the Scottish Third Division at the end of the 2008–09 season. Stenhousemuir also competed in the Challenge Cup, League Cup and the Scottish Cup.

Summary

Season
Stenhousemuir finished sixth in the Scottish Second Division. They reached the Quarter-final of the Challenge Cup, the third round of the League Cup and the fourth round of the Scottish Cup.

Management
Stenhousemuir were managed by Martyn Corrigan for the 2012–13 season, following the resignation of Davie Irons due to personal reasons.

Results & fixtures

Scottish Second Division

Scottish Challenge Cup

Scottish League Cup

Scottish Cup

Player statistics

Squad 
Last updated 12 May 2013

|}

Disciplinary record
Includes all competitive matches.
Last updated 12 May 2013

Team statistics

League table

Division summary

Transfers

Players in

Players out

References

Stenhousemuir F.C. seasons
Stenhousemuir